ACS Mersin is the name of a glass factory in Mersin, Turkey. ACS stands for Anadolu Cam Sanayii ("Anatolian Glass Industry")

The factory was put into operation in 1969. In 1975, it was acquired by Şişecam Group of Companies. In 1988 NNPB (narrow neck press and blow) technology was successfully used for the first time in Turkey at ACS. Current annual glass production is 260 822 metric tons. The number of employees is 461. But after the planned instauration the annual production will rise to 366685 metric tons and the number of employees will increase to 483.

References

Buildings and structures in Mersin Province
Glassmaking companies
Akdeniz District
Industrial buildings in Turkey
Industrial buildings completed in 1975
Companies based in Mersin
Turkish brands
Turkish companies established in 1969
Manufacturing companies established in 1969